Dolnji Kot is a settlement on the left bank of the Krka River in the Municipality of Žužemberk in southeastern Slovenia. The area is part of the historical region of Lower Carniola. The municipality is now included in the Southeast Slovenia Statistical Region. 

A roadside chapel-shrine in the northern part of the settlement was built in 1898.

References

External links

Dolnji Kot at Geopedia

Populated places in the Municipality of Žužemberk